De arte supputandi libri quattuor was the first printed work on arithmetic published in England. Published in 1522, it was written by Cuthbert Tunstall, Bishop of London, and based on Luca Pacioli's Summa de arithmetica, geometria, proportioni et proportionalità. It is dedicated to Sir Thomas More.

References

Mathematics books
16th-century Latin books